This is a list of diplomatic missions of Liechtenstein, excluding honorary consulates. Owing to its size and population, the Principality of Liechtenstein maintains a very small network of diplomatic missions; four embassies in Central Europe, and one embassy in North America.

Since 1919, Switzerland has represented Liechtenstein in those countries wherein Liechtenstein itself does not maintain consular representation.

America

 Washington, D.C. (Embassy)

Europe

Vienna (Embassy)

 Brussels (Embassy)

 Berlin (Embassy)

 Bern (Embassy)

Multilateral organisations
  Brussels (Mission to the European Union)
  Geneva (Mission to the multilateral institutions in that city)
  New York (Mission to the United Nations)
  Strasbourg (Mission to the Council of Europe)

Gallery

See also
 Foreign relations of Liechtenstein
 List of diplomatic missions in Liechtenstein
 List of diplomatic missions of Switzerland

References

External links
 Ministry of Foreign Affairs of the Principality of Liechtenstein.

Foreign relations of Liechtenstein
Liechtenstein
Diplomatic missions